Mecyclothorax rotundicollis is a species of ground beetle in the subfamily Psydrinae. It is endemic to New Zealand. It was described by White in 1846.

References

rotundicollis
Beetles described in 1846
Beetles of New Zealand
Endemic fauna of New Zealand
Endemic insects of New Zealand